Buckaroo Bugs is a 1944 American Western Looney Tunes cartoon film directed by Bob Clampett. The cartoon was released on August 26, 1944, and features Bugs Bunny in his official Looney Tunes debut.

Plot 
The film is set in a small town of the "San Fernando Alley" (San Fernando Valley). According to the narration, "Our story begins when the West was young, and early pioneers settled down to never more roam, and made the San Fernando Alley their home." Despite its Western setting, the short makes references to World War II rationing. A pretend train robbery, lists as "valuable cargo": butter, gasoline, sugar, shoes, and tires – all of them items for which there was a shortage in the War due to rationing. The short also has Bugs stealing all the carrots from a victory garden, which is another World War II reference.

Unlike in most shorts, Bugs Bunny serves as an antagonist. In the cartoon, he plays a carrot thief called the Masked Marauder, whom Brooklyn's "Red Hot Ryder" must bring to justice. The cartoon portrays Red Hot Ryder as a dimwit who cannot distinguish Bugs Bunny from the Masked Marauder, his black horse named Horsey with a mind of its own, and his good-natured slowness is consistently mocked: When Bugs Bunny as the Masked Marauder threatens to shoot Red Ryder, saying, "Stick 'em up, or I'll blow your brains out," the latter treats it like a choice, replying, "Well, now, that's mighty neighborly of you."

In the end, Red Hot Ryder catches on, but is unable to catch the Masked Marauder. Bugs tricks him and his black horse into jumping into the Grand Canyon and they (eventually) crashed down, making a man-and-horse-shaped hole into the ground, Red Hot Ryder finally figures out that Bugs is really the Masked Marauder. Bugs pops up from beneath the ground with a lit candle and says "That's right! That's right! You win the $64 question!" (a reference to the "big prize" on the famous radio quiz show Take It or Leave It). He then kisses him and blows out the candle, with Bob Clampett's "Bay-woop!" sound effect to close the cartoon.

Crew 
 Direction: Robert Clampett
 Story: Lou Lilly
 Animation: Manny Gould (As M. Gould)
 Additional Animation: Robert McKimson, Rod Scribner, Basil Davidovich, A.C. Gamer (effects)
 Layouts and Backgrounds: Thomas McKimson and Michael Sasanoff
 Voice Actors: Mel Blanc, Robert C. Bruce
 Musical Direction: Carl W. Stalling
 Producer: Leon Schlesinger

Home media 
 VHS - Viddy-Oh! For Kids Cartoon Festivals: Bugs Bunny Cartoon Festival Featuring "Hold the Lion, Please"
 VHS - Bugs Bunny Collection: Bugs Bunny on Parade
 LaserDisc - The Golden Age of Looney Tunes, Vol. 2, Side 5: Bob Clampett
 VHS - Looney Tunes: The Collectors Edition Volume 7: Welcome To Wackyland
 DVD - Looney Tunes Golden Collection: Volume 5, Disc 3 (with two commentary tracks: one by Michael Barrier and the other by Spumco workers John Kricfalusi, Eddie Fitzgerald, and Kali Fontecchio)
 Blu-ray/DVD - Looney Tunes Platinum Collection: Volume 2, Disc 1 (with two commentary tracks: one by Michael Barrier and the other by Spumco workers John Kricfalusi, Eddie Fitzgerald, and Kali Fontecchio)

Explanatory notes 
 "Buckaroo Bugs" and "The Old Grey Hare" use the same font for the opening titles. They were both also directed in the same year by Clampett.
 This was Leon Schlesinger's final Warner Bros. cartoon as producer as he sold the studio to Warner Bros. around the time of the release, though Schlesinger was still involved with the marketing of the characters until his death on December 25, 1949.
 This was Bugs Bunny's first short in the Looney Tunes series. At the time, both Merrie Melodies and Looney Tunes were becoming more similar to each other. The Looney Tunes series went into full-time 3-hue Technicolor in 1944.

References

Further reading

External links 
 

1944 films
1944 animated films
1944 comedy films
1944 short films
1940s Warner Bros. animated short films
1940s Western (genre) comedy films
1940s animated short films
American Western (genre) comedy films
Films directed by Bob Clampett
Bugs Bunny films
Films produced by Leon Schlesinger
Films scored by Carl Stalling
Films set in the 19th century
Films set in the San Fernando Valley
Looney Tunes shorts
Warner Bros. Cartoons animated short films
Western (genre) animated films